BOP or Bop may refer to:

Animals and plants
Bird of prey, eagles, hawks, owls and other raptors
Bird-of-paradise, a family of birds
BOP clade, a lineage of plants in the grass family (Poaceae)

Government and law
Balance of power (disambiguation)
Balance of probabilities
Border Observation Post, United States Military Border Observation Post
Border outpost, or border observation post
Breach of the peace (common law)
Federal Bureau of Prisons, a branch of the U.S. Justice Department

Music

Music styles
Bebop, often shortened to "bop", an early modern jazz developed in the 1940s
Hard bop, a style of jazz music that is an extension of bebop (or "bop") music

Songs and albums
"Bop" (DaBaby song), a 2019 song by DaBaby
"Bop" (Dan Seals song), a 1986 song by Dan Seals
Bop!, a 1997 album by jazz saxophonist Frank Morgan
"'Bop'", a 2020 song by CJ (rapper)
"Bop", a 2019 song by Tyga from Legendary
"Bop!", a 2019 song by JoJo Siwa

Places
Bay of Pigs, in Cuba; the site of the abortive Bay of Pigs Invasion by ex-Cubans, supported by the United States
Bay of Plenty, New Zealand
Bay of Plenty Region, named after the bay
Bophuthatswana, South Africa

Science and technology
Balance of plant, the supporting components and auxiliary systems of a power plant
Basic oxygen process, a method of steelmaking
Best Operating Practice (used by Thames Water to describe operation of water and waste water treatment plants in the UK)
BIOS operation (bop), used as noun and verb, a technique to transition from 16-bit virtual x86 mode to 32-bit protected mode utilized by Microsoft's NTDOS
Bleeding on probing, expression used by dentists to signify gingival (gum) bleeding on mechanical stimulation by a probe
Blowout preventer, a large valve used in oil or natural gas drilling
Bond order potential, a form of interatomic potential used, for example, in molecular dynamics simulations
BOP reagent, Benzotriazole-1-yl-oxy-tris-(dimethylamino)-phosphonium hexafluorophosphate

Transportation
Border Pacific Railroad, a short-line railroad headquartered in Rio Grande City, Texas, United States
Bowes Park railway station, London, England; National Rail station code BOP

Other uses
Bop (magazine) an American magazine for teens
B.O.P., The Boy's Own Paper
Balance of payments, measure of payments that flow between any individual country and all other countries
Bottom of the pyramid or base of the pyramid, the largest, but poorest socio-economic group
Broken orange pekoe, a grade of tea leaves
Businessowners policy, a type of insurance policy
Balance of performance (BoP), a mechanism to maintain parity between cars in auto racing